Discourse on Pisa  is a 1499 work by Italian Renaissance historian and political scientist Niccolò Machiavelli about the history of Pisa.

References

1499 books
Works by Niccolò Machiavelli